Königshof may refer to:

 Königshof, a type of Kaiserpfalz or lesser imperial palace in the Holy Roman Empire used as a temporary stop for the emperor
 Königshof, the German name for a royal court

Historical settlements
 Králův Dvůr, town in the Central Bohemian Region, Czech Republic, formerly known as Königshof
 Remetea Mică, village in the Banat, Romania, formerly known as Königshof

Villages and municipalities
 Königshof (Bliesdorf), former outwork, residential area in the municipality of Bliesdorf, county of Märkisch-Oderland, Brandenburg, Germany
 Bad Königshof, former sanatorium near Hann. Münden
 Königshof (Krefeld), village in the Krefeld quarter of Fischeln, North Rhine-Westphalia, Germany
 Königshof (Nittenau), village in the borough of Nittenau, county of  Schwandorf, Bavaria, Germany
 Königshof (Nuremberg), village in the borough of Nuremberg, Bavaria, Germany
 Königshof (Oberharz am Brocken), village in the borough of Oberharz am Brocken, county of  Harz, Saxony-Anhalt, Germany
 Königshof (Töpen), village in the municipality of Töpen, county of  Hof, Bavaria, Germany
 Königshof (Überlingen), village in the borough of Überlingen, Bodenseekreis, Baden-Württemberg, Germany
 Königshof (Wuppertal), village in Wuppertal, North Rhine-Westphalia, Germany

Königshof is the name of the following structures:
 Königshof (Glückstadt), a building in Glückstadt, Schleswig-Holstein, Germany
 Königshof (Krempe),a building in Krempe (Steinburg), Schleswig-Holstein, Germany
 Königshof Haina, a castle in Haina near Gotha, Thuringia, Germany

 Königshof (Winterthur), a building in Winterthur, Kanton Zürich, Schweiz
 Schloss Königshof, a manor house in Bruckneudorf, Burgenland, Austria

Königshof is the name of the following companies:
 Brauerei Königshof, brewery in Krefeld and its products, North Rhine-Westphalia, Germany
 Hotel Königshof (Bonn), hotel in Bonn, North Rhine-Westphalia, Germany
 Hotel Königshof (Munich), hotel in Munich, Bavaria, Germany

See also
 Königshofen (disambiguation)